Hans Bo Berglund (born 26 March 1948) is a Swedish sprint canoeist who competed in the early 1970s. He was eliminated in the semifinals of the K-2 1000 m event at the 1972 Summer Olympics in Munich.

Berglund's father, Hans, won gold in the K-2 1000 m event at the 1948 Summer Olympics in London.

References
Sports-reference.com profile

1948 births
Canoeists at the 1972 Summer Olympics
Living people
Olympic canoeists of Sweden
Swedish male canoeists